Aline Waleska "Pará" Lopes Rosas (born 28 June 1979) is a Brazilian handball player.

She was born in João Pessoa, Brazil. She competed at the 2004 Summer Olympics, where Brazil placed 7th. She also competed at the 2008 Summer Olympics, where Brazil placed 9th.

References

1979 births
Living people
People from João Pessoa, Paraíba
Brazilian female handball players
Olympic handball players of Brazil
Handball players at the 2004 Summer Olympics
Handball players at the 2008 Summer Olympics
Handball players at the 2003 Pan American Games
Handball players at the 2007 Pan American Games
Pan American Games medalists in handball
Pan American Games gold medalists for Brazil
Medalists at the 2007 Pan American Games
Sportspeople from Paraíba
21st-century Brazilian women